Akın Kuloğlu (6 February 1972 – 20 August 2001) was a Georgian-born Turkish boxer who competed in the men's middleweight division (75 kg) at the 1996 Summer Olympics in Atlanta, and the 2000 Summer Olympics in Sydney. Shortly after the games, Kuloğlu moved to the United States, and worked as a taxi cab driver in Chicago suburbs.

He was born in Kutaisi. On August 20, 2001, he was killed in a taxi cab crash in Des Plaines, Illinois.

Olympic Games 
1996 (as a light welterweight under Georgia)
Defeated Ricardo Araneda (Chile) 10–3
Lost to Mohamed Bahari (Algeria) 5–8

2000 (as a light welterweight under Turkey)
Defeated Mariano Carrera (Argentina) – won after the referee stopped the contest for outscoring
Defeated Im Jung-Bin (South Korea) – his opponent retired on the fourth and final round
Lost to Vugar Alakparov (Azerbaijan) 8–18

References

1972 births
2001 deaths
Sportspeople from Kutaisi
Male boxers from Georgia (country)
Boxers at the 1996 Summer Olympics
Boxers at the 2000 Summer Olympics
Olympic boxers of Georgia (country)
Olympic boxers of Turkey
Road incident deaths in Illinois
Turkish male boxers
AIBA World Boxing Championships medalists
Middleweight boxers
People from Kutaisi